Hans Schneider (24 January 1927 in Vienna, Austria - 28 October 2014) was a British-American mathematician, and James Joseph Sylvester Emeritus Professor at the University of Wisconsin–Madison. He was the first president of the  International Matrix Group (1987-1990) and its successor, the International Linear Algebra Society (1990 – 1996), which established the triennial Hans Schneider Prize in 1993. Schneider was a founding editor (1968-1972) and then editor-in-chief of Linear Algebra and Its Applications (1972 - 2012) and an Advisory Editor of the Electronic Journal of Linear Algebra.

He received his Ph.D. from the University of Edinburgh in 1952; his advisor was Alexander Craig Aitken. Following his doctorate, he taught at the Queen's University of Belfast until 1959, when he moved to the University of Wisconsin. He retired in 1993. He was the author of over 160 research papers. His research covered many topics in linear algebra, such as Perron Frobenius theory and related topics,  inertia theory. and lately max algebra. For his experiences in the years 1938 - 1940 see
the Kindertransport site.

Schneider died of cancer at the age of 87.
He was the grandfather of YouTube musician / producer Kurt Hugo Schneider.

References

External links

 For Schneider's PhD students see 
 Hans Schneider at MathSciNet
 Schneider's Homepage Hans Schneider at University of Wisconsin–Madison
 Linear Algebra and Its Applications (LAA)
 Electronic Journal of Linear Algebra (ELA)

1927 births
2014 deaths
20th-century American mathematicians
21st-century American mathematicians
Linear algebraists
Austrian Jews
American people of Austrian-Jewish descent
Alumni of the University of Edinburgh
University of Wisconsin–Madison faculty